is a Japanese actress. She appeared in more than 60 films between 1952 and 1960. She is best known for co-starring in a series of films with Yujiro Ishihara, one of postwar Japan's most famous stars, starting with Crazed Fruit in 1956. They married in 1960 and she retired from acting, assuming her married name, .

Selected filmography
 A Hole of My Own Making (1955)
 Midori haruka ni (1955)
 The Moon Has Risen (1955)
 The Balloon (1956)
 Ruri no kishi (1956)
 Crazed Fruit (1956)
 This Day's Life (1957)
 I Am Waiting (1957)
 Man Who Causes a Storm (1957)
 A Slope in the Sun (1958)
 Fūsoku 40 metres (1958)
 Subarashiki dansei (1958)

References

External links

1933 births
Living people
Japanese film actresses
Actresses from Tokyo
20th-century Japanese actresses